Andrew George Haddad (born August 15, 1978) is a former National Football League wide receiver, who played for the Indianapolis Colts and the Buffalo Bills.  He finished his career with the San Diego Chargers.  He was drafted with the 25th pick of the 7th round in the 2000 NFL Draft by the Buffalo Bills.

Early life and amateur career
Haddad was born in Ohio to George P. and Joyce A. Haddad.

He played high school football at Saint Ignatius High School in Cleveland where he was teammates with Dan O'Leary and Chris Hovan. He graduated in 1996. Haddad was a wide receiver and kick returner at Ignatius and helped lead the team to three Ohio high school football championships and two High School Football National Championships; the team only lost one game in his three years playing on the varsity team. He also earned two varsity letters in basketball and track and field. He was inducted into the school's athletics hall of fame in 2019.

Several college football programs including Miami University, Bowling Green, Villanova and Youngstown State recruited Haddad to play defensive back because they felt that he did not have the skills necessary to be a receiver. He instead accepted a scholarship offer from the University at Buffalo. As a freshman at Buffalo, Haddad played in every game for the Bulls. As a sophomore, he set a school record with 67 catches and tied that record the following year. As a senior, he again set a record for receptions in a single season. In addition to that record, he ended his time at Buffalo as the all-time school leader in total receptions, total receiving yards, total all-purpose yards, total punt return yards and single-season receiving yards. In the fall of 2007 he was inducted into the University at Buffalo's Athletic Hall of Fame.

Professional career
The Buffalo Bills selected Haddad in the seventh round of the 2000 NFL Draft. He signed with the Bills on or about July 17, 2000.

Haddad's single career reception and both of his career kick returns came in the same game. During a November 3, 2002 game with the Indianapolis Colts, Haddad muffed a kickoff by Joe Nedney of the Tennessee Titans. In the following quarter, he returned a Nedney kick for 14 yards before being tackled by Tony Beckham. On the ensuing drive, he caught a pass from Peyton Manning for 11 yards and was tackled by Donald Mitchell. He also fair caught a punt from Craig Hentrich on the eight-yard line to begin Indianapolis' final possession of the game.

In 2004, Haddad played for the Frankfurt Galaxy of NFL Europe. He led the team with 28 receptions and 455 receiving yards. That June, the Buffalo Bills signed Haddad as a free agent.

On October 24, 2004, Haddad saw playing time in the second and final game in his NFL career. He appeared in that day's game for the Buffalo Bills against the Baltimore Ravens but did not accumulate any stats. The Bills released Haddad on September 3, 2005.

On December 20, 2005, Haddad signed with the San Diego Chargers.

Personal life
Haddad married Colleen E. O'Neil in March 2002 in Buffalo and had their wedding reception at UB's Center for the Arts. Haddad met Colleen while she was a student at Buffalo State College and her father, Ed O'Neil, was coaching at Buffalo.

Haddad's father-in-law, Ed O'Neil, was picked by the Detroit Lions in the first round of the 1974 NFL draft. His brother-in-law, Keith O'Neil also played in the NFL. Keith later wrote that he looked up to Haddad when he, like Haddad, was a high school football player struggling to attract the attention of college football recruiters.

His brother, Eric, played fullback at Purdue.

References

1978 births
Living people
People from Westlake, Ohio
Players of American football from Ohio
American football wide receivers
Buffalo Bulls football players
Indianapolis Colts players
Buffalo Bills players
San Diego Chargers players
Frankfurt Galaxy players
Saint Ignatius High School (Cleveland) alumni
Catholics from Ohio